Sarangbang (사랑방, 舍廊房) is a room located in a Korean traditional house (hanok) which served as a man's room, used for studying, writing poetry, and leisure activities. The Koreans created the sarangbang strictly following the Confucianism principles of the Joseon Dynasty. In lower-class homes, the sarangbang is located across from the women's space (anbang), separated with a hall called a daecheong. One of the characteristics of the sarangbang is that it usually has a separate study called a sarangchae. The sarangchae is forbidden to women and only men can enter it.

See also
Anbang
Hanok

References

Architecture in Korea